Panagiotis or Panayiotis, "Παν" (all) "άγιος" (holy or saint) suffix "-της" (which can mean "of the"), is a common male Greek name. It derives from the Greek epithet Panagia or Panayia ("All-Holy") for Mary, mother of Jesus. The feminine form of the name is Panagiota or Panayiota (Παναγιὡτα). 
Having 3 name days within a year (e.g. 2 February, 26 December), one of them is celebrated together with Maria, Mario, Mary, Despoina (or Despina) and all their diminutives on the Dormition of the Theotokos on 15 August.
 There are many diminutives of Panagiotis such as Panos (Πάνος), Notis (Νότης), Panagis/Panayis (Παναγής), Takis (Τάκης, from the diminutive Panagiotakis or Panayiotakis), Panikos (Πανίκος, in Cyprus), Pit (Πιτ), while Panagiota or Panayiota is commonly reduced to Giota or Yiota (Γιώτα), and Nota (Νότα).

Notable people
 Panagiotis Anagnostopoulos, Greek revolutionary and member of the Filiki Eteria
 Panagiotis Beglitis, Greek politician
 Panagiotis Chinofotis, Greek admiral and politician
 Panayiotis Chronis, Greek football player
 Panagiotis Danglis, Greek general and politician
 Panayiotis Demetriou, Cypriot politician
 Panagiotis Doxaras, Greek painter of the 17th/18th century
 Panagiotis Efstratiadis, Greek archaeologist
 Panayiotis Engomitis, Cypriot football midfielder
 Panagiotis Fasoulas, Greek basketball player and politician
 , Greek botanist and agronomist
 Panagiotis Giannakis, Greek basketball player and coach
 Panayiotis Kafkis, Greek professional basketball player
 Panos Kammenos, Greek politician
 Panagiotis Kanellopoulos, Greek politician and two-time prime minister of Greece
 Panagiotis Karatzas (died 1824), Greek revolutionary leader
 Panagiotis Karatzas, Greek basketball player.
 Panos Karnezis, Greek writer
 Panagiotis Kavvadias, Greek archaeologist 
 Panayiotis Kokoras, Greek composer
 Panagiotis Kondylis, Greek social scientist and historian of philosophy
 Panayiotis Kythreotis, Cypriot football player
 Panagiotis Lafazanis, Greek politician
 Panayotis Alexi Lalas, American soccer player
 Panagiotis Lagos, Greek football player
 Panayiotis Loizides (businessman), Cypriot businessman
 Panagiotis Manias, Greek basketball player		
 Panagiotis Markouizos, Greek figure skater and six-times Greek champion
 Panagiotis Meltemis, Greek poet
 Panayiotis Panayiotou Cypriot football player
 Panos Panagiotopoulos, Greek politician
 Panagiotis Papadopoulos, Greek fashion designer based in Sweden
 Panayiotis Paphides, British journalist
 Panagiotis Paraskevopoulos, Greek athlete, 1896 and 1900 Olympics
 ; French comedian and actor
 Panagiotis Pikrammenos, Greek judge, politician, President of the Council of State and Prime Minister of Greece 
 Panagiotis Pipinelis, Greek diplomat, politician and Prime Minister of Greece
 Panagiotis Poulitsas, Greek judge, archaeologist,  President of the Council of State and Prime Minister of Greece
 Panayiotis Pounnas Cypriot footballer
 Panagiotis Sarris, Greek sprinter
 Panagiotis Sekeris, Greek merchant and member of the Filiki Eteria
 Panayiotis Simopoulos, Greek model
 Panagiotis Skagiopoulos, Greek merchant and philanthropist
 Panos Skourletis, Greek politician
 Panagiotis E. Souganidis, Greek mathematician
 Panagiotis Soutsos, Greek poet 
 Panayiotis Spyrou, Cypriot football defender
 Panagiotis Stamatakis, Greek archaeologist
 Panagiotis Stroubakos, Greek runner
 Panagiotis Tachtsidis, Greek footballer
 Panayiotis Tetsis, Greek painter
 Panagis Tsaldaris, Greek politician and two-time prime minister of Greece
 Panayiotis "Peter" Vagenas, American soccer player
 Panayotis Varotsos, Greek academic and physicist 
 Panagiotis Vasilopoulos, Greek basketball player
 Panagiotis Verdes, Greek inventor
 Panagis Vourloumis, Greek politician
 Panayiotis Xiourouppas, Cypriot footballer
 Panayiotis Yamarelos, Greek academic and coroner 
 Panayiotis Vassilakis (Takis), Greek artist
 Panayiotis Zavos, Greek Cypriot reproductive biologist

Other uses of the name
 MV Panagiotis, a ship now wrecked on the shore of the Greek island of Zakynthos

See also
 Panayot (disambiguation)
 Panait

References

External link

Given names of Greek language origin
Greek masculine given names